Son River (also spelt Sone River) is a perennial river located in central India. It originates near Amarkantak Hill in Gaurela-Pendra-Marwahi district of Chhattisgarh and finally merges with the Ganges River near Patna in Bihar. The Sone River is the second-largest southern tributary of the Ganges after the Yamuna River. India's oldest river bridge Koilwar Bridge over Sone River connects Arrah with Patna. Sone river is famous for its sand across country. Multiple dam(s) and hydro-electric projects run on its course towards Ganges.

Course

Sone River is called 'सोन / सोने' in Hindi, but called 'शोण' in Sanskrit, a rare instance of an Indian river having masculine name. Damodar and Brahmaputr also have masculine name. The Sone originates near Pendra in Chhattisgarh, just east of the headwater of the Narmada River, and flows north-northwest through Shahdol district in Madhya Pradesh state before turning sharply eastward where it encounters the southwest-northeast-Kaimur Range. The Sone parallels the Kaimur hills, flowing east-northeast through Uttar Pradesh, Jharkhand and Bihar states to join the Ganges just west of Patna. Geologically, the lower valley of the Son is an extension of the Narmada Valley, and the Kaimur Range an extension of the Vindhya Range. Arwal, Daudnagar, Deori, Rohtasgarh, Dehri, Sonbhadra and Bihta are some of the major cities situated on Sone River.

Its chief tributaries are the Rihand, Kanhar and the North Koel. The Son has a steep gradient (35–55 cm per km) with quick run-off and ephemeral regimes, becoming a roaring river with the rain-waters in the catchment area but turning quickly into a fordable stream. The Son, being wide and shallow, leaves disconnected pools of water in the remaining parts of the year. In the past, the Son has been notorious for changing course. As it is traceable from several old beds near its east bank, the river changed its course more than 5 times. In modern times this tendency has been checked with the anicut at Dehri, and now more so with the Indrapuri Barrage.

In Bihar, this river forms the border line between the Bhojpuri- and Magahi-speaking regions.

Sir John Houlton, the British administrator, described the Son as follows, "After passing the steep escarpments of the Kaimur range, it flows straight across the plain to the Ganges. For much of this distance it is over two miles wide, and at one point, opposite Tilothu three miles wide. In the dry weather there is a vast expanse of sand, with a stream not more than a hundred yards wide, and the hot west winds pile up the sand on the east bank, making natural embankments. After heavy rain in the hills even this wide bed cannot carry the waters of the Son and disastrous floods in Shahabad, Gaya, and Patna are not uncommon."

Dams
The first dam on the Son was built in 1873–74 at Dehri.

The Bansagar Dam in Madhya Pradesh was commissioned in 2008.

Bridges

The 1.44 Km long rail-cum-road lattice-girder concrete and steel Abdul Bari Bridge or Koilwar Bridge near Arrah in Bihar was completed in November 1862.  It remained the longest bridge in India, until the Nehru Setu bridge at Dehri  was opened in 1900. After Nehru Setu bridge at Dehri, Railway Bridges are present on Sone River near Chopan, Vijay Sota & Anuppur.

The modern Son bridge built in Deolond, Shahdol district of Madhya Pradesh was inaugurated by Motilal Vora and Pandit Ram Kishore Shukla then Chief Minister and Finance Minister of Madhya Pradesh on 13 February 1986.

The Government of Bihar sanctioned in 2008 a bridge across the Son River connecting Arwal and Sahar in Bhojpur district.

A four-lane road bridge, carrying NH 30, parallel to the existing rail and road Koilwar Bridge, has been planned.

Gallery

See also
 List of rivers of India

References

 
Tributaries of the Ganges
Rivers of Madhya Pradesh
Rivers of Jharkhand
Rivers of Bihar
Rivers of Uttar Pradesh
Rivers of India